Fatty's Tintype Tangle is a 1915 comedy short film (2 reel).  A man (Fatty), tired of his mother-in-law's henpecking, leaves home in anger and sits on a park bench, where a photographer takes a picture of him sitting next to a married woman, whose husband is not pleased. Conflict ensues.

The movie stars Roscoe "Fatty" Arbuckle (who also directed), Louise Fazenda, Edgar Kennedy, Minta Durfee and Frank Hayes. Arbuckle performs several feats of dexterity in the first few minutes and, near the end, runs and bounces on 17 closely spaced apparent telephone wires over 20 feet (6 m) above the ground.

In 1995, the film was selected for preservation in the United States National Film Registry by the Library of Congress as being "culturally, historically, or aesthetically significant." It has been shown on Turner Classic Movies.

Cast
 Roscoe 'Fatty' Arbuckle - Fatty
 Louise Fazenda - Edgar's Wife
 Edgar Kennedy - Edgar
 Norma Nichols - Fatty's wife
 Mai Wells - Fatty's mother-in-law
 Frank Hayes - Police Chief
 Joe Bordeaux - Passerby with Banana
 Glen Cavender - Photographer
 Bobby Dunn - Laughing Man (uncredited)
 Ted Edwards - Cop (uncredited)
 Charles Lakin - Cop (uncredited)

See also
 List of American films of 1915
 Fatty Arbuckle filmography

References

External links

Fatty’s Tintype Tangle essay by Daniel Eagan in America's Film Legacy: The Authoritative Guide to the Landmark Movies in the National Film Registry, A&C Black, 2010 , pages 44–46 
Fatty's Tintype Tangle on YouTube 

1915 films
1915 comedy films
Silent American comedy films
American black-and-white films
Films directed by Roscoe Arbuckle
American silent short films
United States National Film Registry films
1915 short films
American comedy short films
1910s American films
1910s English-language films